Mount Bassie is a large mountain in the center of Baranof Island, Alaska, United States, within the City and Borough of Sitka.

Mount Bassie is a massive hulk of rock, its footprint covering nearly five square miles. It is bordered by the Blue Lake and Medvejie Lake watersheds and the Baranof River watershed, effectively splitting the island in two (one can see both Chatham Strait and the Pacific Ocean from the peak and its surrounding ridges). Mount Bassie is adjacent to Camp Lake, from which ascents typically originate. It is fairly isolated in terms of sister peaks and has only two modest lower ridges running off the south and north sides of the mountain. The rest of the mountain slopes down steeply into surrounding river valleys. Mount Bassie is rarely summitted, although the western face is frequently traversed on the Baranof Cross-Island Trail.

External links

Mountains of Alaska
Mountains of Sitka, Alaska